Salaheddine Mokdad Saidi (born July 26, 1978) is an Algerian international volleyball player.

Club information
Current club :  MB Bejaia

External links
http://www.fivb.org/EN/Volleyball/Competitions/WorldChampionships/2010/Men/Rounds/Players.asp?Tourn=MQ10AF-D&Team=ALG&No=120346

See also
 Algeria men's national volleyball team

1978 births
Living people
Algerian men's volleyball players
Place of birth missing (living people)
21st-century Algerian people